Pasalingaya 88.1 (DWPY 88.1 MHz) is an FM station by PEC Broadcasting Corporation and operated by Pasalinggaya Media Network. Its studios and transmitter are located at Store #15, Casiguran Plaza Market, M.C. Escudero St., Brgy. Central, Casiguran, Sorsogon.

References

External links
Pasalingaya FB Page

Radio stations in Sorsogon
Radio stations established in 2017